Lethata pyrenodes is a moth of the family Depressariidae. It is found in northern Argentina and Paraná, Brazil.

The wingspan is about 19 mm. The forewings are deep pinkish-yellow-ochreous with a fuscous triangular spot on the middle of the costa. The plical stigma is small and fuscous and the second discal is represented by a strong transverse fuscous mark. There is a faint shade of fuscous suffusion from the costal spot passing behind this to the dorsum and a faintly indicated somewhat darker rather curved line from three-fourths of the costa to near the tornus. The hindwings are ochreous-whitish, towards the apex and termen faintly yellowish-tinged.

References

Moths described in 1915
Lethata